Amorbia productana is a species of moth of the family Tortricidae. It is found in Brazil, Colombia, Costa Rica, Guatemala, Honduras, Mexico, Nicaragua, Panama, and Suriname, where it is recorded from altitudes below 800 meters.

The length of the forewings is 7–9 mm. The ground colour of the forewings is ferruginous brown with the basal, median, and postmedian fasciae darker. The hindwings are pale brown. Adults have been recorded on wing year round.

The larvae have been recorded feeding on Sabicea panamensis and Vernonia patens.

References

Moths described in 1863
Sparganothini
Moths of North America
Moths of South America